Laminin subunit alpha-3 is a protein that in humans is encoded by the LAMA3 gene.

Function 

Laminins are basement membrane components thought to mediate the attachment, migration and organization of cells into tissues during embryonic development by interacting with other extracellular matrix components. The protein encoded by this gene is the alpha-3 chain of laminin 5, which is a complex glycoprotein composed of three subunits (alpha, beta, and gamma). Alternatively spliced transcript variants encoding different isoforms have been identified. 

Laminin 5 is thought to be involved in cell adhesion, signal transduction and differentiation of keratinocytes.

Clinical significance
Mutations in this gene have been identified as the cause of Herlitz type junctional epidermolysis bullosa. 

It may be associated with Laryngoonychocutaneous syndrome.

Interactions 

Laminin, alpha 3 has been shown to interact with SDC2.

References

Further reading 

 
 
 
 
 
 
 
 
 
 
 
 
 
 
 
 
 
 

Laminins